Rogers Road is a name found in various places.

Canada

 Rogers Road is a local road in Toronto.
 Rogers Road streetcar line was a former transit line in Toronto

United States

 Rogers Road is a community in Orange County, North Carolina